The Wasserfall Ferngelenkte FlaRakete (Waterfall Remote-Controlled A-A Rocket) was a German guided supersonic surface-to-air missile project of World War II. Development was not completed before the end of the war and it was not used operationally.

The system was based on many of the technologies developed for the V-2 rocket program, including the rocket itself, which was essentially a much scaled-down version of the V-2 airframe. The rocket motor used new fuels as it was expected to be stored in ready-to-fire form for months, and the guidance system used external fins for control instead of relying entirely on the steerable rocket motor exhaust.

Among the many development problems, control of the high-speed rocket was a significant concern, leading to the development of a radio control system where the operator sat in a reclining chair so they could see the target as it passed overhead. Another significant problem was the lack of a suitable proximity fuse, which was required as there was no way for the operator to visually determine when the rocket was close to a target that was directly above it. A radar-aided system was still under development and not ready for operational use.

Technical characteristics 

Wasserfall was essentially an anti-aircraft development of the V-2 rocket, sharing the same general layout and shaping. Since the missile had to fly only to the altitudes of the attacking bombers, and needed a far smaller warhead to destroy these, it could be much smaller than the V-2, about  the size. The Wasserfall design also included an additional set of fins located at the middle of the fuselage to provide extra maneuvering capability. Steering during the launch phase was accomplished by four graphite rudders placed in the exhaust stream of the combustion chamber, as in the V-2, but once high airspeeds had been attained this was accomplished by four air rudders mounted on the rocket tail.

Unlike the V-2, Wasserfall was designed to stand ready for periods of up to a month and fire on command, therefore the volatile liquid oxygen used in the V-2 was inappropriate. A new engine design, developed by Dr. Walter Thiel, was based on Visol (vinyl isobutyl ether) and SV-Stoff or red fuming nitric acid (RFNA), (94% nitric acid, 6% dinitrogen tetroxide). This hypergolic mixture was forced into the combustion chamber by pressurising the fuel tanks with nitrogen gas released from another tank. Wasserfall was to be launched from rocket bases (code-named Vesuvius) that could tolerate leaked hypergolic fuels in the event of a launch problem.

Guidance was to be a simple radio control manual command to line of sight (MCLOS) system for use against daytime targets. Commands were sent to the missile using a modified version of the FuG 203/FuG 230 "Kehl-Straßburg" (code name Burgund) radio-guidance system that used a joystick.
Originally developed for anti-ship missiles dropped by bombers, it was used to direct both the unpowered Fritz X and rocket-boosted Henschel Hs 293. For the anti-aircraft role, the controller was mounted beside a chair on a framework that allowed the operator to tilt back to easily look at targets above him, rotating as needed to keep the target in sight.

Night-time use was considerably more complex because neither the target nor the missile would be easily visible. For this role a new system known as Rheinland was under development. Rheinland used a radar unit for tracking the target and a transponder in the missile for locating it in flight. A simple analog computer guided the missile into the tracking radar beam as soon as possible after launch, using a radio direction finder and the transponder to locate it. Once it entered the radar beam the transponder responded to the radar signals and created a strong blip on the display. The operator then used the joystick to guide the missile so that the blips overlapped.

The idea was to create a large blast area effect amidst the enemy bomber stream, which would conceivably bring down several airplanes for each missile deployed. For daytime use the operator would detonate the warhead by remote control.

Development 
Conceptual work began in 1941, and final specifications were defined on 2 November 1942. The first models were being tested in March 1943, but a major setback occurred in August 1943 when Dr. Walter Thiel was killed during the Operation Hydra bombings, the start of the Operation Crossbow bombing campaign against V-2 production. After the first successful firing (the third prototype) on 8 March 1944, three Wasserfall trial launches were completed by the end of June 1944. A launch on 8 January 1945 was a failure, with the engine "fizzling" and launching the missile to only 7 km of altitude at subsonic speeds. The following February saw a successful launch which reached a supersonic speed of 770 m/s (2,800 km/h) in vertical flight. Thirty-five Wasserfall trial firings had been completed by the time Peenemünde was evacuated on 17 February 1945.

The Bäckebo rocket, a V-2 rocket using Wasserfall radio guidance, crashed in Sweden on 13 June 1944.

Assessment 
According to Albert Speer and Carl Krauch it could have devastated the Allied bomber fleets. Speer, Germany's Reich Minister of Armaments and War Production, later claimed:

In contrast, historian Michael J. Neufeld has argued that it would not have been possible for Germany to have fielded Wasserfall batteries before its defeat due to the extensive development work needed, and the project continued for too long due to bureaucratic inertia in the German military and the sense of desperation among the German leadership. He has also judged that the missiles would have probably proven ineffective in combat as they would not have been fitted with proximity fuses (which Germany never fielded) and their guidance system was impractical. Similarly, the relevant volume of the book series Germany and the Second World War notes that the Wasserfall was one of several competing missile systems which the Luftwaffe ordered to be developed despite lacking the resources needed to complete or field them during the war.

See also 
 Enzian
 Rheintochter
 Henschel Hs 117 Schmetterling ("Butterfly")
 List of missiles
 List of German guided weapons of World War II
 List of surface-to-air missiles
 Wunderwaffe

References

External links 

 EMW Wasserfall Luft '46 entry
 Wasserfall German Surface to Air Missile
 W-10 Drawing 

Surface-to-air missiles of Germany
World War II guided missiles of Germany